San Nicolás del Puerto is a municipality in the autonomous community of Andalusia, province of Seville, Spain.

References

Municipalities of the Province of Seville